The Akhak gwebeom (Hangul: 악학궤범, Hanja: 樂學軌範; literally "Musical Canon") is a nine-volume treatise on music, written in Korea in the 15th century, in the Joseon Dynasty. It is written by hand in hanja, and depicts, in line drawings, most of the musical instruments in use at the time, with detailed descriptions and fingerings.

See also
 Traditional Korean musical instruments

References
 Chang, Sa-hun (1976). Hanguk Eumaksa (The History of Korean Music). Seoul, South Korea: Eumsa.

External links

 Lists of Akhakgwebeom images 악학궤범 (樂學軌範) from Korean Studies Information Center, Academy of Korean Studies 
 Brief information about 악학궤범 (樂學軌範) from Korean Studies Information Center, Academy of Korean Studies 

Korean traditional music
Joseon dynasty works
Education in the Joseon dynasty